Due to restructuring in the Miss Peru Organization, the national pageant was prevented to be held earlier in the year as originally planned.

Jessica Newton, national Director of the Miss Perú pageant planned a special ceremony on September 22 that took place at the Country Club Lima Hotel in San Isidro, Lima, Peru.

The outgoing titleholder, Valeria Piazza of Lima crowned her successor, Prissila Howard of Piura at the end of the event.

The crowning featured the assistance of special guest Miss Universe 2016, Iris Mittenaere of France.

Howard was appointed to represent Peru at Miss Universe 2017. She was the first runner-up at the 2016 edition of the national pageant. She represented Peru at Miss Grand International 2016 in Las Vegas where she placed in the Top 10, finishing sixth overall.

Piazza and Mittenaere also assisted in the crowning of María José Lora and Lorena Larriviere to represent Peru at the international level.
Lora is a  27-year-old Entrepreneur/Business Owner of L'belle Model Management with the height of 6 feet. Larriviere is a known Peruvian model, nutritionist, and she also was the 1st runner-up at the Miss Peru 2015 pageant.

Lora went on to become the fourth Peruvian to win a major title when she won the title Miss Grand International 2017. 
Larriviere finished in the Top 10 of Reina Hispanoamericana 2017.

2017 Appointments

2017 Miss World Peru Pageant

The Miss World Perú 2017 pageant was held on the night of April 29, 2017. 14 candidates competed for the crown.

The outgoing titleholder, Miss World Peru 2016, Pierina Wong of Lambayeque crowned her successor, Pamela Sánchez of Amazonas as the end of the event.

Sánchez represented Peru at Miss World 2017, where she placed in the Top 40. Reyna placed in the Top 20 at Miss Supranational 2017.

Placements

Special Awards

 Best Model -  Region Lima - Lesly Reyna
 Miss Talent- Ucayali - Giannina Valdez
 Miss Sport - Tacna - Andrea Pacheco 
 Beauty with Purpose - Ancash - Gioconda Florian

Delegates

 Amazonas - Pamela Sanchez 
 Áncash - Gioconda Florian 
 Arequipa - Ana Paula Fernandez
 Cajamarca - Solange Aparicio
 Cañete - Sandra Lock
 Huánuco - Mayra Panduro
 Junín - Pamela Marrache

 La Libertad - Ana Maria Villalobos
 Mollendo -  Sandra Boitano
 Region Lima - Lesly Reyna
 San Martín - Karen Rojas
 Sullana - Tatyana Reusche
 Tacna - Andrea Pacheco
 Ucayali - Giannina Valdez
 

.

References

Miss Peru
2017 in Peru
2017 beauty pageants